Pavel Kuznetsov (born 10 July 1961) is a former Soviet weightlifter, Olympic champion and world champion. He won the gold medal in the heavyweight I class at the 1988 Summer Olympics in Seoul.

References

External links
 
 

1961 births
Living people
People from Alexandrovsky District, Vladimir Oblast
Russian male weightlifters
Soviet male weightlifters
Weightlifters at the 1988 Summer Olympics
Olympic weightlifters of the Soviet Union
Olympic gold medalists for the Soviet Union
Olympic medalists in weightlifting
Medalists at the 1988 Summer Olympics
World Weightlifting Championships medalists
Sportspeople from Vladimir Oblast